I Army Corps (I. Armeekorps) was a corps in the German Army during World War II. It was established by upgrading the former staff of the 1st Division of the Reichsheer at Konigsberg on 1 October 1934.

At the start of World War 2 the I Army Corps (I. Armeekorps) was assigned to the 3rd Army commanded by Georg von Kuchler. During the invasion of poland it consisted of the 11th infantry division; 61st infantry division and panzer divison kempf.

Commanders

Area of operations
 Poland - September 1939 to May 1940
 France - May 1940 to June 1941
 Eastern Front, Northern Sector  - June 1941 to October 1944
 Courland Pocket - October 1944 to May 1945

See also
 List of German corps in World War II

References

External links

Army,01
Military units and formations established in 1934
Military units and formations disestablished in 1945